The Queensland Railways 6D8½ class locomotive was a class of 0-6-0T steam locomotives operated by the Queensland Railways.

History
The 6D8½ class was a class of similar locomotives built by John Fowler & Co, Leeds over a 23-year period. Per Queensland Railway's classification system they were designated the 6D8½ class, the 6 representing the number of driving wheels, the D that it was a tank locomotive, and the 8½ the cylinder diameter in inches.

Class list

References

Railway locomotives introduced in 1900
6D8
0-6-0T locomotives
3 ft 6 in gauge locomotives of Australia
Fowler locomotives